The 1963 Arlington State Rebels football team was an American football team that represented Arlington State College (now known as the University of Texas at Arlington) as an independent during the 1963 NCAA College Division football season. In their eleventh year under head coach Chena Gilstrap, the team compiled a 1–8 record. The Rebels season finale against Hardin–Simmons scheduled for November 23 at Memorial Stadium was canceled in deference to the assassination of John F. Kennedy which occurred the previous day at Dallas.

Schedule

References

Arlington State
Texas–Arlington Mavericks football seasons
Arlington State Rebels football